Malik Riaz Khan (born 13 July 1948) is a Pakistani politician from Bannu District who served as a member of the Khyber Pakhtunkhwa Assembly belong to the Jamiat Ulema-e-Islam (F). He also served as chairman and member of the different committees.

Political career
Khan was elected as the member of the Khyber Pakhtunkhwa Assembly on ticket of Jamiat Ulema-e-Islam (F) from PK-73 (Bannu-IV) in 2013 Pakistani general election.

References

1948 births
Living people
Pashtun people
Jamiat Ulema-e-Islam (F) politicians
Khyber Pakhtunkhwa MPAs 2013–2018
People from Bannu District